Liversedge railway station served the town of  Liversedge, in the historical county of West Riding of Yorkshire, England, from 1848 to 1965 on the Leeds New Line.

History 
The station was opened as Liversedge on 18 July 1848 by the Lancashire and Yorkshire Railway. 'Central' was added onto its name on 2 June 1924 but it was later dropped on 12 June 1961. It closed on 14 June 1965.

References

External links 

Disused railway stations in West Yorkshire
Former Lancashire and Yorkshire Railway stations
Railway stations in Great Britain opened in 1848
Railway stations in Great Britain closed in 1965
1848 establishments in England
1965 disestablishments in England
Beeching closures in England